Pulau Bukom, also known as Pulau Bukum, is a small restricted-access island belonging to Singapore that is located about five kilometres to the south of Mainland Singapore, off the Straits of Singapore.

Pulau Bukom is also known as Pulau Bukom Besar, which has a small companion islet to its south called Pulau Bukom Kechil. This companion islet is currently connected to Pulau Ular and Pulau Busing by reclaimed land, making the three of them appear as one large island on satellite imagery.

Etymology

The island's name is thought to come from the Malay name for a seashell called rangkek bukom, which is wide at one end and tapers to a narrow point, the shape of the island prior to land reclamation. Bukum is said to be the same as hukum, and there is a tradition that a raja used to try cases on the island, hence the name, probably through the intermediate form berhukum.

History

The island was home to the native Malay islanders before government efforts to relocate them back to mainland Singapore for redevelopment. Pulau Bukom appears in Franklin and Jackson's 1828 map as Po. Bukum. The island, originally a mangrove swamp, was also a source of fresh water for ships. In 1884, an Italian trader named Giovanni Gaggino established a water company on the island to supply water to passing ships.

Access

Access to the island is restricted. Security pass is issued only to personnel working on the island. 
A ferry (from the Pasir Panjang ferry terminal) serves the island. The ferry operator is Tian San Shipping. 
The security checks are very tight, and no unauthorized person is allowed to enter the island.

See also
Laju incident

References

Victor R Savage, Brenda S A Yeoh (2003), Toponymics - A Study of Singapore Street Names, Eastern Universities Press,

External links

Satellite image of Pulau Bukum - Google Maps

Bukom
Western Islands Planning Area
Industrial estates in Singapore